The 1977 North Dakota State Bison football team was an American football team that represented North Dakota State University during the 1977 NCAA Division II football season as a member of the North Central Conference. In their second year under head coach Jim Wacker, the team compiled a 9–2–1 record, finished as NCC champion, and lost to Jacksonville State in the Grantland Rice Bowl.

Schedule

References

North Dakota State
North Dakota State Bison football seasons
North Central Conference football champion seasons
North Dakota State Bison football